Achenheim is a commune in the Bas-Rhin department and Grand Est region of north-eastern France.

The village, which is in the arrondissement of Strasbourg and the canton of Lingolsheim lies close to the Canal de la Bruche and to the departmental road connecting Soultz-les-Bains to Strasbourg.

History
The oldest traces of human habitation in Alsace – tools used by Homo erectus in the Paleolithic era some 700,000 years ago – have been found in loess deposits at Achenheim.

In 1264 the village was burnt down by forces from Strasbourg during the war between the city and its bishop, Walter de Geroldseck.

Waterways
 Canal de la Bruche
 Bruche River

Administration

Population

See also
 Communes of the Bas-Rhin department

References

Communes of Bas-Rhin